Montaignac-Saint-Hippolyte is a former commune in the Corrèze department in central France. On 1 January 2022, it was merged into the new commune of Montaignac-sur-Doustre.

Population

See also
Communes of the Corrèze department

References

External links

 Official site

Former communes of Corrèze